Philometroides eleutheronemae is a species of parasitic nematode of fishes, infecting the gonads of marine perciform fishes off the eastern Indian coast. It was first found in the fourfinger threadfin, Eleutheronema tetradactylum. It is distinguished from its cogenerates by the gubernaculum structure in males, as well as the shape and structure of the females' cephalic and caudal ends, and their oesophagus.

References

Further reading
Moravec, František, et al. "New records of philometrids (Nematoda: Philometridae) from marine fishes off Iraq, with the erection of two new species and the first description of the male of Philometroides eleutheronemae Moravec & Manoharan, 2013." Systematic Parasitology93.2 (2016): 129-144.
Moravec, Frantisek, and Ben K. Diggles. "Philometrid nematodes (Philometridae) from marine fishes off the northern coast of Australia, including three new species." Folia Parasitologica 61.1 (2014): 37.

External links
WORMS

Camallanida
Parasitic nematodes of fish
Fauna of India